Mamal Temple or Mamaleshwar Temple is a Hindu temple located in Pahalgam town in Kashmir Valley. According to legend, this is the temple where Ganesha was placed as door keeper by Parvati, not allowing anyone to enter the premises without her permission. This is the place where Shiva cut the head of Ganesha and gave him an elephant head. Mam Mal means don't go, and thus it is also known as Mammal temple.

History
This temple was constructed around 400 AD (1,600 years ago) and was reconstructed and opened for worship in the medieval period. The Rajatarangini refers to a temple called Mammesvara and recorded its decoration with a gloden kalasa at its top by king Jayasimha.

Legend
According to legend, this is the temple where Ganesha was placed as door keeper by Parvati, not allowing anyone to enter the premises without her permission. This is the place where Shiva cut the head of Ganesha and gave him elephant head. Mam Mal means don't go, and thus it is also known as Mammal temple.

References

Kashmir
Hindu temples